Agrotis yelai is a moth of the family Noctuidae. It is found in Spain.

References

External links
Image

Agrotis
Moths of Europe
Moths described in 1990